The 2016–17 Biathlon World Cup – Individual Men started on Thursday 1 December 2016 in Östersund and finished on Thursday 16 February 2017 at the World Championships in Hochfilzen. The defending titlist was Martin Fourcade of France.

The small crystal globe winner for the category was Martin Fourcade of France.

Competition format
The  individual race is the oldest biathlon event; the distance is skied over five laps. The biathlete shoots four times at any shooting lane, in the order of prone, standing, prone, standing, totalling 20 targets. For each missed target a fixed penalty time, usually one minute, is added to the skiing time of the biathlete. Competitors' starts are staggered, normally by 30 seconds.

2015–16 Top 3 standings

Medal winners

Standings

References

Individual Men